Lieutenant General Tom Richardson Copinger-Symes,  (born 18 November 1969) is a British Army officer, who serves as the Deputy Commander, Strategic Command since May 2022. He previously served as General Officer Commanding Force Troops Command and Director of Military Digitisation, Strategic Command.

Background and education
Of Anglo-Irish descent, Copinger-Symes is the youngest son of Colonel Wilfred Copinger-Symes and his wife Susan née Richardson. Educated at Pangbourne College, Copinger-Symes went up to the University of Warwick, as a cadetship officer.

Military career
Copinger-Symes was commissioned into the Royal Green Jackets in 1992. He served as commanding officer of the 5th Battalion, The Rifles in Afghanistan from November 2011 and April 2012, for which he was appointed an Officer of the Order of the British Empire. He became commander of the 1st Intelligence, Surveillance and Reconnaissance Brigade in April 2014 and Assistant Chief of Staff (Operations) at Army Headquarters in June 2016. Copinger-Symes was promoted Commander of the Order of the British Empire in the 2017 Birthday Honours, and became General Officer Commanding Force Troops Command that December. He went on to be Director of Military Digitisation at Joint Forces Command in 2019. In May 2022 he was promoted to lieutenant general and was made Deputy Commander of Strategic Command.

As Assistant Colonel Commandant, Copinger-Symes was present at Windsor Castle in 2020 to offer the salute to The Rifles Regiment's outgoing Colonel-in-Chief, the Prince Philip, Duke of Edinburgh.

Copinger-Symes serves on the Advisory Board of Nimbus Ninety, the community for disruptive business and technology leaders, since 2018.

References

|-
 

|-
 

1969 births
Living people
People educated at Pangbourne College
Alumni of the University of Warwick
Graduates of the Royal Military Academy Sandhurst
Royal Green Jackets officers
Military personnel from London
Commanders of the Order of the British Empire
British Army personnel of the War in Afghanistan (2001–2021)
British Army lieutenant generals